Albert Dadon AM (born 1957) is an Australian businessman, philanthropist and musician. He was born in Morocco and grew up in Israel and France before immigrating to Melbourne, Australia in 1983. He is prominent in promoting cultural and business links between Australia and Israel. He undertakes a range of activities covering international affairs, political activism and cultural activities within Australia and overseas exchange programs. He is executive chairman of Ubertas Group, a diversified funds management and property development company.

From 1991 to 1993 Dadon was chairman of the French Chamber of Commerce in Australia (Victorian Chapter). He established "Le Concours des Vins du Victoria", a wine competition in Australia.

From 1994 to 1996, he was director of the Australia French Foundation, an appointment made by Senator Gareth Evans, the then Minister of Foreign Affairs of Australia. This foundation was initiated by the then prime minister, Bob Hawke, as a gift to France for the bicentennial of the French Revolution.

In 2001 Dadon was chairman of the United Israel Appeal in Victoria. He founded in 2002 and then chaired the Australian Israel Cultural Exchange, an organization launched through a Joint Declaration between the Australian and Israeli Governments. A joint declaration announcing and supporting the establishment of AICE by Alexander Downer MP, Australian Minister for Foreign Affairs, and Binyamin Netanyahu MK, Israeli Minister for Foreign Affairs, took place simultaneously in Parliament House, Canberra and the Ministry for Foreign Affairs, Jerusalem. It was the first time that such a joint declaration has been made between the two countries. Dadon also publishes a quarterly magazine for AICE titled Rhapsody. 

From 2003 to 2005 Dadon was chairman of the Melbourne Jazz Festival. In 2005 he brought to Melbourne the Umbria Jazz Festival, which was named "Umbria Jazz Melbourne 05". The festival in 2005 attracted 135,000 visitors under the artistic direction of Carlo Pagnotta. The festival is mainly funded by the Victorian government through Victoria Major Event Company and Arts Victoria. In 2006 the organisation appointed Dadon to become the new director of the festival and take the artistic lead. 

The appointment of Dadon as artistic director resulted in a change of name of the festival to Melbourne Jazz, and the 2007 edition of the festival enjoyed the presence of more than 200 artists from the world around, performing in ten venues in 112 concerts during its ten days. Some of the artists who played at the festival were Herbie Hancock, Chick Corea, Gary Burton and McCoy Tyner.

In 2003 Dadon founded the Australian Jazz Bell Awards (named after Australian legend and patron of the event Graeme Bell, AO). Dadon chairs the board of The Australian Jazz Awards Limited (a not-for-profit arts organisation) that governs the awards. The Bells are the only form of formal recognition system entirely devoted to the jazz art form in Australia. They recognise the achievements of young and established Australian jazz performers and composers. 

In 2008 Dadon received an Order of Australia (AM) for service to the arts, particularly through the Melbourne Jazz Festival, through philanthropic support for cultural and charitable organisations, and to business.

In 2009, Dadon established the Australia Israel Leadership Forum which then became the Australia UK Israel Leadership Dialogue once the UK joined the group in 2011.

In March 2015, Albert Dadon realised one of his long-term dreams with the opening of Bird's Basement, a Jazz Club in Melbourne, in association with Birdland New York.  

Albert Dadon is the chairman of The Leadership Dialogue Institute which is a private diplomatic channel fostering closer cultural ties between Australia, the UK, and Israel. The ‘Institute’ is a think tank composed of political, academic, and business leaders and personalities who are willing and eager to exchange on crucial, meaningful, delicate, and sometimes taboo topics.

Dadon founded the organisation in 2009, it was then called the Australia Israel Leadership Forum.  The next year—at the behest of John Spellar, a British Labour Party, Member of Parliament, who served in government several times—Dadon agreed to broaden the scope of the organisation so it would include the U.K. At its following convention in 2011, the think tank was rechristened The Australia UK Israel Leadership Dialogue as it greeted the U.K. as an active member and a major scope of the organisation for the first time. That year the Dialogue hosted Tony Blair. The following Dialogue (2012) was held within the beating heart of British democracy: the UK Parliament. Over the years, although most of the speakers-debaters have been from the original three nations, the Institute has enjoyed the presence of guest-participants emanating from Canada, the United States and France. In the interest of remaining as inclusive and transparent as possible, the organisation altered its name to its current form in 2017. 

Under his stage name "Albare", Dadon is a jazz guitarist and composer. He has recorded two albums with Festival Records in Australia and produced A History of Standard Time, Joe Chindamo's first solo recording and featuring Ray Brown. His latest albums are Midnight Blues (2007), After the Rain (2009), Travel Diary (2010), Long Way (2012), The Road Ahead (2013), 2 Decades of Jazz (2014), Only Human (2015), Dream Time (2016), Urban Soul (2017), Urbanity by Urbanity (2018), Albare Plays Jobim (2020), Albare Plays Jobim Vol 2 (2021). 
.

References

Notes

General
AICE Formation
 Australia and Israel Set Up Cultural Exchange
Parliamentary Debates (Hansard)
1994 Music Awards Nominations
Jazz's Global Ambitions
Australian Jazz
Albare Plays Jobim

Leadership Dialogue
Leadership Dialogue
i24NEWS One-on-One with Albert Dadon
Jewish News
New figure steals into the limelight of Jewish affairs

1967 births
Living people
Australian philanthropists
Australian businesspeople
Australian musicians
Australian Jews